Sonali Phogat (21 September 1979 – 23 August 2022) was an Indian politician and former social media personality from Haryana. She was a leader of the Bharatiya Janata Party from Hisar, and was the national vice president of the BJP Mahila Morcha. She has also been credited in a few hindi movies.

Early and personal life 
Sonali Phogat was born in a small village in Hisar district of Haryana called Bhuthan. She was married to Sanjay Phogat who died in 2016 and has a daughter, Yashodhara Phogat.

Career

Politics 
Sonali Phogat started political life as national vice president of BJP Mahila Morcha in 2008. She contested Haryana Assembly elections in 2019 as BJP candidate from the Adampur constituency Haryana Assembly election against Kuldeep Bishnoi.

Professional life 
She started her professional career by anchoring in Hisar Doordarshan. In 2020 she contested in reality show Big Boss.

Death 
Phogat died on 23 August 2022 under mysterious circumstances during her trip to Goa, to which the police suspects a murder. Sudhir Sagwan and Sukhwinder Wasi, her associates are suspected of killing her.

References 

1979 births
2022 deaths
Bharatiya Janata Party politicians from Haryana
Bharatiya Janata Party